Rick's Café may refer to:
 
 The fictional bar "Rick's Café Américain", which is the principal set of the film Casablanca.
 Rick's Café Casablanca, the modern reconstruction of that bar in that city, an operating restaurant, bar, and cafe.

Fictional drinking establishments